is a railway station in the city of Nagaoka, Niigata, Japan, operated by East Japan Railway Company (JR East).

Lines 
Nagaoka Station is served by the following lines:
Joetsu Shinkansen
Shinetsu Main Line
Joetsu Line

Station layout
The station has two ground-level island platforms for normal trains. However, Track 1 is not used by any regularly-scheduled trains and it is normally closed off to passengers.

There are two elevated opposed side platforms for the Joetsu Shinkansen, with two through tracks in the middle. The Shinkansen platforms, constructed under the tenets of the 1973 Basic Plan to build out the high-speed network, were designed to be converted to island platforms to interface with the Uetsu Shinkansen, which was planned to run alongside the Joetsu Shinkansen between Nagaoka and Niigata. The opposite side of Track 11's platform is fenced, with a trackless railbed reserved for this purpose, and there is space reserved outside the station structure to allow the construction of a railbed for a track adjoining the platform for Track 12. As of 2016, however, there are no plans to revisit the "Uetsu Shinkansen".

The station building is located above the local platforms and underneath the Shinkansen platforms. The station has a Midori no Madoguchi staffed ticket office.

Platforms

History

Nagaoka Station opened on 16 June 1898. With the privatization of Japanese National Railways (JNR) on 1 April 1987, the station came under the control of JR East.

Passenger statistics
In fiscal 2017, the station was used by an average of 11,694 passengers daily (boarding passengers only).

Gallery

References

External links

 Nagaoka Station 

Railway stations in Nagaoka, Niigata
Railway stations in Japan opened in 1898
Stations of East Japan Railway Company
Shin'etsu Main Line
Jōetsu Shinkansen
Jōetsu Line